Proof of Life is the second solo album by American rock singer Scott Stapp. It was released on November 5, 2013. "This is the most meaningful record of my career," said Stapp. "I've made a lot of messes in my life but I've learned I can take a mess and turn it into a message. This album chronicles my struggles, my journey and it's the most honest record I have ever written." The album was produced by Howard Benson and mixed by Chris Lord-Alge.

Critical reception

The album received mixed to positive reviews from critics. Stephen Thomas Erlewine of AllMusic described the album as being "something of a travelogue of a dark night of the soul" and wrote that Stapp is "at home when he's allowed to bellow alongside massive walls of guitars". Jack Arlin of SPIN said of the album, "It's oddly diverse. Stapp's reputation as a neo-grunge belter may be changing."

Track listing

Personnel
Musicians
Scott Stapp – lead vocals
Phil X – guitar
Tim Pierce – guitar
Scott Stevens – guitar, backing vocals
John Paul Nesheiwat – guitar
Paul Bushnell – bass guitar
Marti Frederiksen – guitar
Kenny Aronoff – drums
Josh Freese – drums
Isaac Carpenter – drums

Production
Howard Benson – production, keyboards
Lenny Skolnik – programming
Marti Frederiksen – programming

References

 

Scott Stapp albums
2013 albums
Wind-up Records albums